The University of Missouri–Kansas City (UMKC) is a public research university in Kansas City, Missouri. UMKC is part of the University of Missouri System and one of only two member universities with a medical school. As of 2020, the university's enrollment exceeded 16,000 students. It is the largest university and third largest college in the Kansas City metropolitan area. It is classified among "R2: Doctoral Universities – High research activity".

History

Lincoln and Lee University
The school has its roots in the Lincoln and Lee University movement first put forth by the Methodist Church and its Bishop Ernest Lynn Waldorf in the 1920s. The proposed university (which was to honor Abraham Lincoln and Robert E. Lee) was to be built on the Missouri–Kansas border at 75th and State Line Road, where the Battle of Westport (the largest battle west of the Mississippi River during the American Civil War) took place. The centerpiece of the school was to be a National Memorial marking the tomb of an unknown Union soldier and unknown Confederate soldier. Proponents of the school said it would be a location "where North met South and East met West." The Methodist interest reflected the church's important role in the development of the Kansas City area through the Shawnee Methodist Mission which was the second capital of Kansas.

As the Methodists started having problems piecing together the necessary property, other civic leaders including J.C. Nichols began pushing to create a cultural center on either side of Brush Creek, just east of the Country Club Plaza. According to this plan the Nelson-Atkins Museum of Art and Kansas City Art Institute would be built north of Brush Creek around the estate of The Kansas City Star publisher William Rockhill Nelson and a private nonsectarian University of Kansas City (initially proposed as a junior college) would be built south of the creek. In addition, a hospital would be constructed around the estate of Kansas City Journal-Post publisher Walter S. Dickey. The hospital was never built.

In 1930, after the Methodists had brought the Kansas City Dental School into their fold, the two plans were merged. The new school was to be called "Lincoln and Lee, the University of Kansas City." and plans were underway to develop it into a four-year school.

The university was built on a  plot, southeast of the Nelson mansion. William Volker had purchased and donated this land for the University of Kansas City. The original Volker purchase did not include the Dickey mansion itself. Dickey died unexpectedly in 1931 and Volker acquired it to be the first building.

University of Kansas City

The two groups were to squabble back and forth, with Ernest H. Newcomb attempting to mediate. The Church did not maintain its ties, and the Lincoln and Lee name was abandoned. The school announced that it would start if 125 students enrolled. The target was met, and the University of Kansas City, or "KCU" for short, held its first classes in October 1933 with a faculty of 17 and a student enrollment of 264.

The campus (now expanded to ) is called the Volker Campus. The Dickey mansion is now Scofield Hall. The second building on the campus, the library, was named for Newcomb. A Carl Milles fountain on Brush Creek opposite the Nelson Gallery is called the Volker Fountain.

The University of Kansas City grew quickly, and soon incorporated other existing local private institutions of higher learning. The Kansas City School of Law, which was founded in the 1890s and located in downtown Kansas City, merged into the university in 1938. The Kansas City-Western Dental College followed in 1941 and the Kansas City College of Pharmacy merged in 1943. This was followed by the Kansas City Conservatory of Music in 1959. During this period, the university also established the School of Administration in 1953, the School of Education in 1954, and the Division for Continuing Education in 1958.

University of Missouri–Kansas City

On July 25, 1963, at the urging of alumnus Hilary A. Bush, the university became part of the University of Missouri System and $20 million of assets including 23 buildings were transferred to the University of Missouri. At the time, KCU had 3,300 students (2,000 full-time) and 175 full-time faculty.

At the time Missouri already owned the campuses in Columbia and Rolla. Accordingly, the university's name was changed to the University of Missouri–Kansas City. After this, UMKC established the School of Graduate Studies in 1964, the School of Medicine in 1970, the School of Nursing in 1980, the School of Basic Life Sciences in 1985 (which was renamed the School of Biological Sciences in the mid-1990s), and the School of Computing and Engineering in 2001.

In 2012, the school conducted studies on whether to rename the school back to the University of Kansas City (while still remaining in the University of Missouri system). In November 2012, the school decided against the change noting at the time, "while prospective students and the community at large had strong interest in the name change, several other important groups — current students, faculty/staff, and alumni — do not favor a name change at this time."

In the mid and late 2010s, UMKC came under fire for corruption and cover-ups that alleged a pursuit of outside money above all else. Critics highlighted examples in the management school and pharmaceutical school, including a faculty member who required international students to perform personal tasks for him and false information used to rank the business school.

Academics

Academic units
Today, the academic divisions of UMKC are as follows:

 the College of Arts and Sciences
 the Conservatory of Music and Dance
 the Henry W. Bloch School of Management
 the School of Biological and Chemical Sciences
 the School of Computing and Engineering
 the School of Dentistry
 the School of Education
 the School of Law
 the School of Medicine
 the School of Nursing and Health Studies
 the School of Pharmacy
 the School of Graduate Studies

The School of Medicine is known for its six-year post-secondary program, wherein a student spends only six years obtaining both a Bachelor of Arts and Doctor of Medicine degree. The school is located away from the main campus on Hospital Hill, where it is connected to Truman Medical Center, a large research hospital.

The School of Law is one of four law schools in Missouri (St. Louis University School of Law, University of Missouri School of Law, and Washington University School of Law are the others). It is one of only seven American law schools to have educated both a President of the United States (Harry S. Truman) and a Justice of the Supreme Court of the United States (Charles Evans Whittaker). Truman attended but did not graduate from the law school and never practiced law. The schools that actually have had President-Supreme Court graduates who practiced law are Yale Law School, Harvard Law School, Columbia Law School, the University of Virginia School of Law, the William & Mary Law School and the University of Cincinnati College of Law.

The university is the home of New Letters, a literary magazine, as well as the nationally syndicated public radio program New Letters on the Air. For over 50 years, UMKC has broadcast live, taped, and syndicated programming over KCUR, the university's radio station and NPR affiliate.

In 2004, the Fungal Genetics Stock Center moved to UMKC where it is in the School of Biological Sciences. The FGSC was founded in 1960 and is supported by the US National Science Foundation. The FGSC distributes research materials around the world, and is part of the World Federation for Culture Collections. Collaborators include researchers at the Broad Institute and the US Department of Energy Joint Genome Institute.

UMKC Theatre is considered to have one of the stronger M.F.A. programs in acting in the country. In 2017, 2018, and 2019 the MFA costume design program was ranked in the top 10 best costume design schools in the country by The Hollywood Reporter.

The university is the site where the Supplemental Instruction program was established and developed.

Rankings

In 2014, Princeton Review named the university a "Best Value" public university, for the third consecutive year.

In the 2015 U.S. News & World Report Best Colleges rankings, UMKC was ranked 189th in the National Universities category.

Many of the individual graduate programs have been ranked higher. The pharmacy school was ranked 31st, Public Affairs graduate programs are ranked 73rd, the Nonprofit Management emphasis within the MPA program is ranked 15th, the school of nursing is ranked 58th, the School of Law is ranked 114th, and the school of education is ranked 117th.

Athletics

UMKC's mascot is Kasey Kangaroo (originally drawn by Walt Disney). Historically, UMKC athletics had used the identity of "UMKC Kangaroos," but the short form "Roos" was widely used both within and outside of the program. On July 1, 2019, the athletic program officially rebranded itself as the Kansas City Roos. The school's colors are old gold and royal blue. It is a member of the NCAA's Division I Summit League, having rejoined that conference on July 1, 2020, after seven years in the Western Athletic Conference.

The men's soccer team won the Summit League men's soccer championships in 1996, 1999, 2001, 2003, and 2010.  The team set an NCAA record on October 12, 2001, with the fastest trio of goals scored in Division I soccer during the MLS era, by scoring three times in 1:46 against Valparaiso University. Notable Roos soccer players have included goalkeepers Kevin Corby and Connor Sparrow, defenders Roberto Albuquerque and Coady Andrews, forwards Levi Coleman, Eric McWoods, and Jordan Rideout, and midfielders Manny Catano, Jony Muñoz, and Bryan Pérez.

The department sponsors: men's basketball and women's basketball, men's soccer and women's soccer, men's tennis and women's tennis, men's golf and women's golf, men's indoor and outdoor track & field and women's indoor and outdoor track & field, men's cross country and women's cross country, softball, and volleyball. The men's and women's basketball teams play at Swinney Recreation Center. UMKC sponsors 16 sports for both men and women at the intercollegiate level. In April 2007, the school dropped its Co-Ed Rifle Program in order to add women's soccer and men's baseball. Women's soccer was added to the institution for the 2009–10 school year.

Campuses
UMKC is spread across multiple locales; the main Volker Campus, home to the majority of university operations, is located in Kansas City, Missouri Rockhill neighborhood, east of the Country Club Plaza, and adjacent to both the Stowers Institute for Medical Research and the Linda Hall Library. In 2017 the university, in collaboration with Truman Medical Center, Children's Mercy Hospital, the Missouri Health Department, the Jackson County Medical Examiners Office, and the Missouri Department of Mental Health Behavioral Medicine, formed the UMKC Health Sciences District on Hospital Hill. This district is a first-in-the-nation partnership between local and state governments, the university, and these nationally recognized healthcare faculties, designed to promote collaboration in research, innovation, education, grant funding, and community outreach, for the advancement of health and wellness in the greater Kansas City metropolitan area. Also in 2017, the university announced plans to expand its metropolitan identity with the construction of a downtown Campus for the Arts, located near the Kauffman Center for the Performing Arts.

Volker Campus

UMKC has two campuses in Kansas City. Most of UMKC's main campus (Volker campus) is inside a square formed by Volker Boulevard (north), Oak Street (west), 53rd Street (south), and Troost (east). The "Hospital Hill" campus houses the health sciences academic departments. Directly across Troost from UMKC is Rockhurst University, a Jesuit university.

Hospital Hill Campus
The Hospital Hill Campus houses the School of Nursing, the School of Medicine, the School of Dentistry, and the School of Pharmacy.

Buildings

Biological Sciences Building

Built in 1972, the Biological Sciences Building is located north of the Spencer Chemistry Building and east of Katz Hall. The building houses offices, classrooms, and research laboratories of the School of Biological Sciences. The school offers undergrad, grad, and doctoral degrees in the life sciences.  The Biological Sciences Building and Spencer Chemistry Building are connected on four of its floors; in addition to this, the south stairwell on the basement floor of the Biological Sciences Building is the north stairwell of the Spencer Chemistry Building.

Fine Arts Building

The Fine Arts Building was built in 1942 and remodeled in 1975. Currently, the Art and Art History departments use the building. Student works are often displayed in the building's UMKC Gallery of Art.

Spencer Chemistry Building

The building, located at 51st & Rockhill, was built in 1972 using funds donated by Helen Spencer. The purpose of the building was to nurture scientific advancement at UMKC. It currently houses the main office of the Chemistry Department, as well as several chemistry laboratories and classrooms. Spencer Chemistry Building and the Biological Sciences Building are connected on four of its floors.

The Quad

The majority of UMKC's students regularly attend classes in buildings on the Quad. These buildings are Flarsheim Hall, Newcomb Hall, Manheim Hall, Royall Hall, Haag Hall, and Scofield Hall.

Cockefair Hall
Cockefair, (pronounced coke-fair), is located on Rockhill across from Flarsheim Hall. It was built in 1950 and is named for former faculty member Carolyn Cockefair, who was a humanities professor at UMKC. The building currently houses the departments of History, English, and Philosophy.

Flarsheim Hall
Flarsheim Hall was built in 1999, and is the largest building on UMKC's campus. The Chemistry, Physics, and Geosciences departments, as well as the School of Computing and Engineering, are located in Flarsheim Hall. The hall was named after Robert H. Flarsheim, who left a $9 million endowment to the university in his estate. Flarsheim Hall is located on the northeast corner of the Quad.

Haag Hall

Haag Hall (pronounced Hāg), built in 1937, contains offices and classrooms including the departments of mathematics and communication studies. Its most recognizable features are large murals stretching along the main stairwell. Haag Hall is connected to both Royall and Flarsheim Halls. Haag Hall is located on the southeast corner of the Quad.

Katz Hall

Completed in 1965, Katz Hall is named in honor of Isaac and Michael Katz, founders of a major Kansas City drug store chain. The building currently houses the Department of Architecture, Urban Planning + Design's offices and classrooms, and was once the location for the School of Pharmacy. The Pharmacy School has moved to the Health Sciences Building on UMKC's Hospital Hill campus, approximately four miles north of the Volker Campus.

Manheim Hall

Manheim Hall, along with Newcomb Hall were the first two buildings originally built for the university. It is named for Ernest Manheim, a professor of sociology, who taught at the university and founded its sociology program. Currently, Manheim Hall houses offices. It is connected to Royall Hall by a second-floor walkway. Manheim is located on the southwest corner of the Quad.

Newcomb Hall

Newcomb Hall (built in 1936) was named after the first manager of the university, Ernest H. Newcomb. Originally designed to house the library, Newcomb Hall is now home to offices, the University Archives, the Western Historical Manuscript Collection and the Edgar Snow Collections. Newcomb Hall is located on the extreme west edge of the quad.

Royall Hall

Royall Hall was built in 1968 and is almost exclusively classrooms. Two large lecture halls are on the ground floor, and an astronomical observatory is on the roof. Also on the ground floor is a lounge area with an Einstein Bros. Bagels. Royall Hall is connected to both Manheim and Haag Halls, and to a five-level parking structure across the street. Royall Hall is located on the south end of the Quad.

Scofield Hall

Scofield Hall was built in 1912, and was originally a private residence. In 1931, William Volker acquired it and donated it to the university. It was named after Carleton Scofield, who was chancellor of the university when it merged with the University of Missouri System. The Arts & Sciences advising office as well as the Language Resource Center and the Department of Foreign Languages & Literatures are located in Scofield Hall. Scofield Hall is located on the north end of the Quad.

Epperson House

Epperson House is located south of 52nd St. between Oak and Cherry. The Tudor-Gothic structure was completed in 1923 at a cost of $450,000. Originally built as a private residence, Epperson House contained 48 rooms, six bathrooms, elevators, a swimming pool, and a billiard room, spread through four floors. The residence was built by Uriah S. Epperson, who was a banker, industrialist, and philanthropist who amassed significant wealth from insurance and meat-packing industries. The building was donated to the university in 1942 for use as a men's dormitory until 1956. Epperson is well known for its apparent hauntings, which earned it a spot on Unsolved Mysteries as one of the top five haunted houses in the United States.

University Center and Atterbury Student Success Center

The University Center (known as the "U-Center") was built in 1961. The student dining hall is located here, as is Pierson Auditorium, an often used site for career fairs or luncheons. In 2012, the University Center underwent renovations and was rededicated as the Atterbury Student Success Center. It was designed to promote student academic success.

Swinney Recreation Center

Swinney Recreation Center was built in 1941, and was gifted to the university by E. F. Swinney. There are five basketball courts, an Olympic-sized swimming pool, racquetball and squash courts, weight-training center, soccer field, and indoor and outdoor tracks at the recreation center. Along with the Kansas City Club and the Pembroke Hill School, Swinney is one of only three locations in Kansas City containing squash courts. University students, faculty and staff have access to the center, and paid memberships are open to others.

James C. Olson Center for the Performing Arts

Known on campus simply as the PAC (Performing Arts Center), this building partially houses the Conservatory of Music and Dance and the Department of Theatre, as well as the Kansas City Repertory Theatre. The PAC, designed by Kivett and Myers, opened in 1979 and contains White Recital Hall, Helen F. Spencer Theatre, and a black box theatre space, Studio 116.

Proposed new downtown arts campus
A proposal for a new downtown arts campus got a funding boost on June 26, 2013, with a $20 million challenge grant from the Muriel McBrien Kauffman Foundation, but an additional $70 million needs to be raised. The backers say a new campus will increase the profile of the university's arts programs and the new performing arts facility. The first phase involves moving the university's Conservatory of Music and Dance to a location in the Crossroads District. Other programs would be moved in subsequent phases.

Housing
As of 2020, 6% of the university's students lived in housing that was owned by UMKC, operated by it, or affiliated with it. The remainder lived off-campus.

Cherry Hall

Begun in 1955, Cherry Street Hall, located at 5030 Cherry Street, was a more traditional-style dormitory on the UMKC Volker campus. It housed approximately 300 students in 168 single, double and triple rooms with each floor being separated by gender and sharing a communal bathroom. Cherry Street Hall was often regarded by students as having better opportunities for social interaction than Oak Street. In 2009, Cherry Street Hall was closed as a student residence. In 2011 the Psychology Department moved into the newly renovated Cherry Hall.

Twin Oaks Apartments

Formerly located at 5000 Oak Street, Twin Oaks Apartments was acquired by the university in 1998 to house students who desired more independent living than the dormitory could provide. In the years since, however, the buildings had begun to show their ages. In 2002, the university decided it would be more cost-effective to demolish Twin Oaks and build a new residence hall in its place. UMKC stopped renting to new prospective tenants in 2005, and to current tenant extended a grace period for them to locate new housing. The buildings were completely vacant by 2006. In September 2006, the Kansas City Fire Department used Twin Oaks in a firefighters training program. Demolition by wrecking ball followed in November 2006 and was completed in 2007.

Oak Street Hall

Completed in 2004, Oak Street Hall is located at 5051 Oak Street. The five-story building houses approximately 559 students in single room and suite-style two-bedroom suites. The ground level is a large common lobby with a kitchen, laundry facility, music practice rooms, pool tables and a widescreen television set. On floors 2–5, kitchenettes, vending machines, quiet study rooms and social lounges comprise the common areas. Oak Hall was set as the quality standard for the UMKC 30-year Master Plan.

Oak Place Apartments

The Oak Place Apartments are located at 5050 Oak Street on land once occupied by the demolished Twin Oaks Apartments. Twin Oaks construction on Oak Place was started in 2007 and Oak Place was opened to students in 2008. Oak Place consists of two four story apartment complexes separated by an above ground parking structure. Oak Place houses around 500 students in 1, 2, and 4 bedroom suite style apartments, each complete with a kitchen. Common areas include lounge areas, an academic room, and 1 computer lab in each building.

Herman and Dorothy Johnson Hall

Herman and Dorothy Johnson Hall is the latest residence hall on the UMKC Volker Campus and is located to the immediate north of Oak Place Apartments. Construction was started in 2008 and the hall opened in 2009. The four story hall houses up to 328 students in the traditional dormitory style with suites of single and double occupancy rooms with their own shared suite bathroom. Johnson Hall has gender-segregated by floor housing. Common areas include music practice rooms, a computer lab, laundry rooms, and outdoor green space.

Student activities

Greek life
Greek Life at the University of Missouri–Kansas City is administered by the Office of Student Involvement's Fraternity and Sorority Affairs. UMKC is home to 26 Greek Letter Organizations (8 social fraternities, 8 social sororities, and 10 professional fraternities). Although the Greek population is relatively small (4.5% of the overall student population), it maintains a proud heritage, and several chapters have received awards from their organization's international offices.

Greek Life at UMKC traces its origins to 1936, with the establishment of the Bounders Fraternity. The Bounders was the first social organization recognized by the University of Kansas City, and the fraternity originated many of UMKC's school traditions. The Bounders even led the push for the removal of university president Clarence Decker. Decker's resignation in 1953 opened the door for both intercollegiate athletics and national Greek organizations on campus. In 1956, the Bounders petitioned Delta Chi and received a charter. Delta Chi became the first national fraternity to charter on the UMKC campus. The Delta Rho chapter of Alpha Phi Alpha was founded four years earlier, in 1952; however, it was originally chartered at nearby Rockhurst University and did not submit its charter for official recognition by UMKC until 1963.

Traditions
Hobo Day and Bum Friday

One of the best known traditions in the history of UMKC was Hobo Day, later known as Bum Friday. The campus-wide event was created as Hobo Day, and it first occurred on May 8, 1935, to celebrate the end of the spring semester. Students dressed as hobos throughout the day, and various events and competitions took place. The day started with the Hobo parade, and then everyone gathered in the quad where university president Clarence Decker would read a proclamation that he was cancelling classes and turning the university over to the students. President Decker was an appropriate master of ceremonies for the day, as he had lived the life of a hobo during a portion of his younger years. Events throughout the day included beard growing contests, pie eating contests, glee club performances, skits satirizing campus life, car rallies, talent shows, and athletic contests. The Bum Friday Queen and the Most Fascinating Man were crowned, and the day ended with a dance in which students switched out their bum attire for formal wear. Awards for the daytime activities were presented at the dance. A bonfire closed out the evening. In 1951, Hobo Day was renamed Bum Friday, although the activities essentially remained the same. In 1982, the Student Life Office put a stop to Bum Friday and replaced it with "Roo Fest", which lacked many of the activities and traditions of Bum Friday and its predecessor, Hobo Day.

The Bounder Bells
Alumni members of the former Bounders Fraternity raised nearly $30,000 in donations for the purchase of a Van Bergen 49-bell carillon. The Bounder Bells was dedicated on the UMKC campus in May 1989. The carillon is located in the tower of the Swinney Recreation Center. The bells controlled by an electronic keyboard, and they ring on the hour. The bells can also can be programmed to play melodies.

Notable alumni and faculty

Chancellors
Presidents (when the school was independent)/Chancellors (when the school became part of the University of Missouri system) of the school are:

Ernest H. Newcomb, executive secretary, 1933–36
John Duncan Spaeth, president, 1936–38
Clarence Decker, president, 1938–53
Roy Rinehart, interim, 1953
Earl J. McGrath, president, 1953–56
Richard M. Drake, president (initially interim), 1956–61
Carleton F. Scofield, president 1961–63, chancellor 1963–65 (becomes part of University of Missouri System)
Randall M. Whaley, chancellor, 1965–67
Hamilton B.G. Robinson, interim, 1967–68
James C. Olson, chancellor, 1968–76
Wesley J. Dale, interim, 1976–77
George A. Russell, chancellor, 1977–92
Eleanor Schwartz, chancellor, 1992–99
Gordon Lamb, interim, 1999–2000
Martha Gilliland, chancellor, 2000–05
Elson Floyd, interim via system president capacity, 2005
Steven Lehmkuhle, interim, 2005
Guy Bailey, chancellor, 2006–08
Leo Morton, chancellor (initially interim) 2008–17
Barbara A. Bichelmeyer, interim, 2017-18
C. Mauli Agrawal, chancellor, 2018–present

References

External links 

 
 Kansas City Athletics website

 
Educational institutions established in 1933
1933 establishments in Missouri
University of Missouri-Kansas City